Trailmakers is a sandbox video game developed and published by Danish independent developer Flashbulb Games. The game is a 3D physics-based vehicle construction simulator with open world exploration elements. The game was made available for early access on Steam on 30 January 2018, and fully released on 18 September 2019 for PC and Xbox One. The game was released for PlayStation 4 on 21 May 2020.

Gameplay
Trailmakers can be played in various game modes including adventure, sandbox, and racing. All game modes can be played in either single-player or multiplayer and the game offers modding support on PC. The camera is usually third-person, but can be changed to first-person by the player.

Release
The game was originally released as an early access title on the Steam store on 30 January 2018 and garnered over 100,000 sales. The game was fully released for PC and Xbox One on 18 September 2019, and for PlayStation 4 on 21 May 2020.

Notes

References

External links

2019 video games
Open-world video games
PlayStation 4 games
Indie video games
Video games developed in Denmark
Windows games
Multiplayer and single-player video games
Racing video games
Xbox One games
Flashbulb Games games